I Knew Jesus (Before He Was a Star) is the 24th album by American singer/guitarist Glen Campbell, released in 1973.

Track listing

Side one
"I Knew Jesus (Before He Was a Star)" (Neal Hefti, Seymore Styne) – 2:50
"I Take It On Home" (Kenny O'Dell) – 3:11
"Sold American" (Kinky Freidman) – 3:22
"I Want to Be with You Always" (Lefty Frizzell) – 2:18
"If Not for You" (Bob Dylan) – 2:46

Side two
"Give Me Back That Old Familiar Feeling" (Bill C. Graham) – 2:46
"You're the One" (Bob Morrison) – 2:42
"Amazing Grace" (John Newton) – 4:24
"On This Road" (Ted Hamilton) – 2:18
"Someday Soon" (Ian Tyson) – 2:16

Personnel
Glen Campbell – vocals, acoustic and electric guitars, bagpipes
James Burton – electric guitar
Carol Kaye – bass guitar
Robert Ross – acoustic guitar
Hal Blaine – drums
Larry Muhoberac – keyboards
Josephine Dapar – backing vocals

Production
Producer – Jimmy Bowen
Arranger – Dennis McCarthy
Engineer – John Guess
Art direction – John Hoernle
Design – Roy Kohara

Charts
Album – Billboard (United States)

Singles – Billboard (United States)

Glen Campbell albums
1974 albums
Capitol Records albums
Albums produced by Jimmy Bowen